Bahiga Hafez (13 December 1908 – 4 August 1983) was an Egyptian screenwriter, composer, director, editor, producer and actress.

Personal life 
Bahiga Hafez was born and raised in Alexandria, Egypt to an aristocratic family with ties to monarchy. Hafez began studying music in Cairo and later went on to study musical composition in Paris, studying piano at the conservatory. Hafez could speak French, Arabic, and other languages. Hafez was a Pacha heiress.

After returning to Egypt, she lived in Cairo where she held literary salons. Also upon her return to Egypt, Hafez released an album entitled Bahiga that played on the radio broadcast of the time.

In 1930, she starred in the film Zeinab (1930). This caused her family to disinherit her, since working in cinema was seen as shameful at the time, especially for someone of her social status.

Career
Hafez is often cited as being one of the pioneering women in Egyptian cinema.

She started her career in film as an actress, starring in the silent film Zeinab (1930), directed by Mohammed Karim,  which she also composed the score for. Karim had been searching for a particularly feminine face for the title role, and after meeting Hafez at a party, offered her the role. The film itself was quite popular. Her involvement in this project sparked her interest in working in film.

Hafez founded the company Fanar Films in 1932. With Fanar Films, Hafez co-directed the film al-Dahaya (1932), called "The Victims" in English, in which she also played a major role. She was also the costume designer, composer and editor for the film. She remade the film 3 years later with sound.

Hafez's first solo directed film was Laila bint al-sahara (Laila the Desert Girl),1937 (Alternative title: Laila bint al-Badawiyya), but was not released until 1944 with a new title, Layla al-Badawiyya (Layla the Bedouin). Hafez worked as director, producer (with Fanar Films), co-screenwriter, composer, and lead actress. The film was to be premiered at the Venice Film Festival in 1938 but was banned from playing in Egypt due to its negative depictions of Persians, especially Persian royalty; it was to be released the same year in Egypt as the wedding of the Shah of Persia and the Princess Fawzia of Egypt. Unfortunately, the film wasn't very successful.

After not working in film for quite some time, Hafez was asked by director Salah Abou Seif to star as one of the Princesses in his film el Qâhirah talâtîn (1966). This marked Hafez's return to cinema, but also her last appearance.

Unfortunately, much of her work as a filmmaker has been lost and only the mentions of her work remains. A copy of her film al-Dahaya was found in 1995.

Tribute
On August 4, 2020, Google celebrated her 112th birthday with a Google Doodle.

Filmography

References

Egyptian screenwriters
Egyptian directors
Egyptian composers
Egyptian producers
Egyptian actresses
1908 births
1983 deaths
Egyptian women film directors
People from Alexandria
20th-century screenwriters